The Majhūl date ( - tamar al-majhūl, literally, unknown, from جَهِلَ, to not know) also known as Medjool, Medjoul, or Majhool, is a large, sweet cultivated variety of date (Phoenix dactylifera) from the Tafilalt region of Morocco, also grown in the United States, Israel, Palestine, Iran, Saudi Arabia, South Africa,and Jordan. The variety is planted both for harvesting and for landscaping. The Medjool is a distinct landrace, described as producing "large soft fruit, with orange-yellowish flesh, and a mildly rich and pleasing flavor." Israel currently holds more than 60 percent of the global Mejhoul market share, making it the largest exporter of Mejhoul dates in the world.

Medjool dates are high in oxalates (18.47-233.35 mg/100 g DW).

See also
 Jujube, also called the "red date" or "Chinese date"

References

External links 
 

Date cultivars